Catopsis sessiliflora is a species in the genus Catopsis. This species is native to West Indies, and also to Latin America from Puebla and Jalisco south to Peru.

References

sessiliflora
Flora of the Caribbean
Flora of South America
Flora of Central America
Flora of Mexico
Plants described in 1802
Flora without expected TNC conservation status